Parineeta (English: Married woman) is 1942 Bengali film directed by Pashupati Chatterjee based on Sarat Chandra Chattopadhyay's 1914 novel of same name. The English title for the film is The Fiancée.

Plot 
The film is based on Parineeta, a famous Bengali novel by famous Indian author Sarat Chandra Chattopadhyay, which was first published in year 1914.

External links

1942 films
Films based on Indian novels
Bengali-language Indian films
Indian black-and-white films
Films set in Kolkata
Films based on works by Sarat Chandra Chattopadhyay
Films about women in India
Indian romance films
1940s romance films
1940s Bengali-language films